Yan Zi (born 12 November 1984) is a retired mainland Chinese-Hong Kong tennis player.

Career summary
In 2005, at the age of 20, Yan Zi won her only WTA Tour singles title at the Guangzhou International Open.

In singles, she first reached the world top 100 in January 2006, achieving a then career-high of world No. 72 that March before failing to defend her breakthrough run of results the previous year and dropping back outside the top 100 that October. Her ranking had slumped to 262 by February 2007 after a year of disappointing results, but her results then picked up again over the rest of 2007; and she regained the top 100 for the first time in ten months after a spectacular run at the Tier I Canada Masters in August, reaching the semifinals before finally being defeated by world No. 1, Justine Henin, in straight sets.

In doubles, her highest ranking is No. 4; she won two Grand Slam titles, partnering with Zheng Jie. While she has been good at doubles, her singles performance has been inconsistent as her form fluctuated. She has winning records against top-10 stars Jelena Janković 2–0, Ana Ivanovic 1–0, and Marion Bartoli 1–0.

In 2014, Yan received Hong Kong citizenship. In April 2016, she became captain of the Hong Kong Fed Cup team. She announced her retirement that year.

Singles career in detail

2002–2003
Until January 2002, Yan met with mixed results as a singles player in the lower reaches of the ITF tournament hierarchy. But that month, she reached the final of a $10k event at Hull, losing to Liu Nannan. In May, she avenged this defeat with a win over Liu in the first round of a $50k at Fukuoka; and again in August she defeated Liu, this time in the quarterfinal of a $25k tournament at Beijing, only to lose to Rika Fujiwara in the semifinal. In September, she qualified for the WTA Tour contest at Shanghai, only to lose in the first round. However, she had reached numerous ITF Circuit quarterfinals during the year, and finished it ranked for the first time inside the world top 300, at No. 299.

In February 2003, she narrowly failed to qualify at Hyderabad, losing to Maria Kirilenko in a tight three-set match in the final round of qualifying. She put in her career-best performance to date at Fukuoka, reaching the semifinal with wins over Rika Fujiwara and Sun Tiantian, before losing to Saori Obata despite winning more games, the scoreline standing at 6–2, 6–7, 5–7. In July, she qualified for a WTA event at Palermo by defeating Zheng Jie and Ivana Abramović, then fell in the main-draw first round to Italian rising star Francesca Schiavone in another three-setter in which she won more games than her victorious opponent, the scoreline this time being 6–0, 4–6, 3–6. These defeats suggest that she quickly runs out of steam after giving it all in the first set, thereby allowing her opponent to regroup and eventually pocket the contest. The same week, she defeated Sun Tiantian to qualify for a $50k event at Modena, and in the main draw ousted Yulia Beygelzimer and Adriana Serra Zanetti en route to a quarterfinal loss. In September, she qualified for another WTA event, the Japan Open, and defeated Ashley Harkleroad in round two before losing, on this occasion, to Zheng Jie in the quarterfinals. In December, she reached the semifinal of a $50k tournament for the second time in the year, beating Tzipora Obziler in the quarterfinal at Changsha before losing to another of her prominent countrywomen, Peng Shuai. The following week, she narrowly lost in the quarterfinal of the $50k contest at Shenzhen to future star Sesil Karatantcheva, in three sets. The year had brought great improvement to Yan's singles results, and her year-end ranking correspondingly improved to 179.

2004
Unfortunately, 2004 set back her progress slightly. The year began poorly for her with a string of early losses, although she was ambitiously targeting only WTA events now, raising the bar on the required standard for successful competition. She failed to win a first-round main draw match the entire year, meeting only with moderate success in qualifying rounds; and ultimately the only relief she could find towards salvaging her world ranking was a retreat to ITF Circuit late in the year. She reached the semifinal of a $25k tournament at Beijing in September (losing again to Zheng Jie), and the same stage at Shenzhen (where she shocked by Li Na in the quarterfinals, then lost yet again to Zheng). This late flourish of results was enough to limp her home to a year-end ranking of 248.

2005
In January 2005, Yan battled her way past three high-quality opponents, Julia Schruff, Shikha Uberoi and Melinda Czink, to qualify for Tennis Gold Coast, an important WTA event, where she was removed by Tatiana Golovin of France. Then in May, she managed to beat Uberoi again after qualifying for Rabat with a win over Sun Tiantian, only to lose to Arantxa Parra Santonja in the second round. Then in June, she surpassed her previous career-best result, reaching the final of a $50k tournament at Beijing with wins over Sun and Zheng, but lost in the final to less-feted countrywoman Li Ting. The following month, as a direct entrant to the WTA event at Modena, she defeated the much higher-ranked Marta Domachowska of Poland before losing a close three-setter to Sanda Mamić. In September, she avenged her defeat by Li Ting to qualify for Bali, only to succumb to her former doubles partner Li Na in round two of the main draw.

In September 2005, she began competing in the WTA event at Guangzhou, this year up-rated to Tier III status, and shocked herself by proceeding to win the entire tournament, having previously failed to win even one ITF singles title, and having only once reached the quarter-final stage at any WTA Tour event. To achieve this astonishing outcome, she had to produce some of her best tennis to conquer defending champion Li Na in the quarterfinal, which she finally won 6–7, 7–5, 7–6, after an intense battle. The other matches against worthy opposition looked easy by comparison, as she crushed Marta Domachowska for the loss of just three games in round two, fought past impressive emerging teen star Victoria Azarenka in the semifinal, and was up 6–4, 4–0 against Nuria Llagostera Vives in the final when the Spaniard conceded victory.

A semifinal result in November's $50k Shenzhen tournament capped off what had proved to be a superlative year for Yan, leaving her world-ranked 104, within the direct-entry threshold of Grand Slam events and minor WTA tournaments, and within the qualifying-entry threshold of even the more exclusive WTA fixtures.

2006

She began the season by narrowly failing to qualify for Tennis Gold Coast, despite wins over Vania King and Shikha Uberoi, as Angela Haynes defeated her in three sets. But she succeeded in qualifying for Sydney with stunning straight-sets victories over Eva Birnerová, Denisa Chládková and Anastasia Yakimova, and beat the high-ranked Anna Chakvetadze in two sets in the main-draw first round before losing a three-set match to Francesca Schiavone, who had to struggle through a nail-bitingly close second-set tiebreak to avoid a straight sets loss to Yan, only to win the final set by a more comfortable margin.

As if these scores were not enough to prove her capability to the wider world, at the Australian Open she knocked out former No. 15 and the previous year's semifinalist, Nathalie Dechy of France, in the first round, she then defeated unseeded Aleksandra Wozniak, before suffering to former No. 19, Sybille Bammer. February brought more disappointing results in singles for Yan, as she lost a three-setter to Emma Laine of Finland at Pattaya, and failed to qualify for Doha and Dubai. But still, her January results and some points picked up in qualifying rounds in February had improved her world ranking to No. 66, just one place behind Li Na.

2007
At the second round of the Canada Masters in Toronto, she upset world No. 4, Ana Ivanovic, with a score of 6–3, 6–1 in just over an hour, even as Ivanovic had a rare off day. She then beat Eleni Daniilidou in the third round and 2007's Wimbledon's finalist Marion Bartoli (who retired while trailing 2–6, 0–3) in the quarterfinals. Yan's run was ended in the semifinals by world No. 1, Justine Henin, who showed the door through a straight-sets win over her.

2008
Yan started 2008 poorly, with a first-round loss at the Australian Open to eventual quarterfinalist Venus Williams. However, at the Bangalore Open she upset Maria Kirilenko saving three match points. Afterwards she managed to upset Jelena Janković in a quarterfinal, winning 6–3, 3–6, 6–3, however Janković did struggle with a shoulder injury. She eventually lost to runner-up Patty Schnyder in straight sets and made her top-50 debut afterwards at No. 43.

At the Summer Olympics, Yan and her partner Zheng Jie won the women's doubles bronze medal, defeating the Ukrainian duo of Alona and Kateryna Bondarenko in the bronze medal match.

2009
In January, Yan played qualifying singles, women's doubles, and mixed doubles at the Australian Open. In qualifying singles, she was seeded eighth but lost to unseeded Alexandra Panova in the qualifying second round. In women's doubles, she partnered with Zheng Jie and was seeded sixth and lost in the third round. In mixed doubles, she partnered with Mark Knowles of the Bahamas and was seeded second and lost in the second round. Because of playing doubles extensively her singles ranking has dropped to where it is hard for her to get into events. She has started playing doubles with Chuang Chia-jung, now because she wants to get out of Zheng's shadow. The choice was more so, though, because she wants to improve her singles ranking.

Olympics

Doubles: 1 bronze medal match (1–0)

WTA career finals

Singles: 1 title

Doubles: 17 titles, 11 runner-ups

ITF Circuit finals

Singles: 2 (2 runner-ups)

Doubles: 23 (16 titles, 7 runner-ups)

Grand Slam performance timelines

Singles

 1as of 2008, Doha is a Tier I tournament, replacing San Diego and Zurich

Doubles

References

External links

 
 
 
  Yan Zi's blog

1984 births
Living people
Australian Open (tennis) champions
Hong Kong female tennis players
Olympic bronze medalists for China
Olympic tennis players of China
Tennis players at the 2004 Summer Olympics
Tennis players at the 2008 Summer Olympics
Wimbledon champions
Olympic medalists in tennis
Tennis players at the 2010 Asian Games
Asian Games medalists in tennis
Grand Slam (tennis) champions in women's doubles
Sportspeople from Chengdu
Medalists at the 2008 Summer Olympics
Tennis players at the 2002 Asian Games
Tennis players at the 2006 Asian Games
Asian Games gold medalists for China
Asian Games bronze medalists for China
Medalists at the 2006 Asian Games
Medalists at the 2010 Asian Games
Tennis players from Sichuan
Chinese female tennis players